The 1936 Walker Cup, the 9th Walker Cup Match, was played on September 2 and 3, 1936, at Pine Valley Golf Club, Pine Valley, New Jersey. The United States won by 9 matches to 0 with 3 matches halved.

Format
Four 36-hole matches of foursomes were played on Wednesday and eight singles matches on Thursday. Each of the 12 matches was worth one point in the larger team competition. If a match was all square after the 36th hole extra holes were not played. The team with most points won the competition. If the two teams were tied, the previous winner would retain the trophy.

Teams
The United States team of 11 was announced in April. Francis Ouimet was the captain and was given the option of whether to play himself or not. The day before the match started he announced that he had decided not to play, to give the younger players a chance and that all the other 10 members of the team would play in either the foursomes or the singles. Six members of the Great Britain and Ireland team were announced in late May, before the Amateur Championship. These were William Tweddell, the captain, Bentley, Langley, Lucas, McLean and Thomson. The remaining four were announced in early June. Tweddell did not select himself or Laddie Lucas for any of the matches. Lucas had recently had an attack of tonsilitis.

United States

Playing captain: Francis Ouimet
Albert Campbell
George Dunlap
Walter Emery
Johnny Fischer
Harry Givan
Johnny Goodman
Reynolds Smith
George Voigt
Ed White
Charlie Yates

Great Britain & Ireland
 & 
Playing captain:  William Tweddell
 Harry Bentley
 Morton Dykes
 Cecil Ewing
 Alec Hill
 John Langley
 Laddie Lucas
 Jack McLean
 Gordon Peters
 Hector Thomson

Wednesday's foursomes
The American pair of Harry Givan and George Voigt were seven up on Alec Hill and Cecil Ewing after six holes of the second round and were still three up with four to play. However, Hill and Ewing won the next three holes to level the match after 17 holes and with the last hole halved in par fours the matches was halved.

Thursday's singles

References

Walker Cup
Golf in New Jersey
Walker Cup
Walker Cup
Walker Cup